The following is a list of cast members who have portrayed characters in The Chronicles of Narnia film series. The Chronicles of Narnia is based upon the novels of the same name by C. S. Lewis.

List

See also 

 List of actors who have played Narnia characters

References

External links 
 Cast and crew at NarniaWeb

 
Chronicles of Narnia